Shafi U Ahmed was the High Commissioner of Bangladesh to United Kingdom from 2007 to 2009. Previously he served as Bangladesh's High Commissioner to Malaysia.

Ahmed is an alumnus of The Fletcher School, Tufts University, Boston, USA, from which he graduated in 1986.

Ahmed served in different Bangladesh Missions abroad as well as in the Ministry of Foreign Affairs of Bangladesh in various capacities including as the Director General for Administration.

References

Year of birth missing (living people)
Living people
Bangladeshi diplomats
The Fletcher School at Tufts University alumni
High Commissioners of Bangladesh to Malaysia
High Commissioners of Bangladesh to the United Kingdom